The 2019 MLB London Series was a two-game Major League Baseball series between the New York Yankees and the Boston Red Sox at London Stadium in London, United Kingdom, in 2019. Sponsored by Mitel, it is branded as Mitel & MLB Present London Series. These were the first MLB games ever played in Europe.

The games were played on June 29–30, 2019, with the Red Sox serving as the designated "home" team for both games.

Background

Participating teams
The inaugural series was played between the Red Sox and Yankees, longtime divisional rivals, who had expressed specific interest in participating in the London games. Salter noted that the Yankees and Red Sox are among MLB's most iconic teams, and contrasted the NFL's reluctance to send its high-profile teams to London, as they would be too disruptive to their lucrative and comparatively limited schedules (with a 16-game regular season in comparison to MLB's 162-game regular season). Via their parent company Fenway Sports Group, the Red Sox are also co-owned with Premier League club Liverpool F.C.

Roster

Venue
Locating a venue with the correct dimensions required for a baseball field was difficult, especially as the majority of stadiums in the London region are primarily designed for association football. MLB officials had evaluated multiple options (including cricket grounds such as The Oval), before finalizing London Stadium as the site.  The facility was originally constructed for the 2012 Summer Olympics; in late-2015, it was reported that MLB officials had measured the stadium's dimensions and considered it potentially suitable for baseball, and had negotiated the possibility of holding games there.

MLB developed a plan to make London Stadium for the games resemble an MLB ballpark, via installation of a new baseball field as an overlay on top of the stadium's existing running track and soccer pitch, with a seating configuration to emulate the more "intimate" layout and fan experiences of MLB ballparks. As the facility's locker rooms are smaller and suited towards soccer, larger, MLB-style clubhouses were built within the stadium. As done at Toronto's Rogers Centre, dimensions from home plate are posted in feet and meters:  to the foul poles and 385 feet (117.4 m) to center field, with a  fence. The dimensions have been described as being potentially hitter-friendly. As the roof overhangs the home plate area, there is a ground rule that balls hitting the roof are considered dead.

On April 29, 2019, it was announced that ProgrammeMaster, a London-based sports publisher, had secured the rights to produce the official gameday programme. On May 24, 2019, it went on sale online, priced at £10.

Broadcasting 
In the United States, television rights for the series were split between Fox and ESPN respectively, with both games called by their lead commentary teams (led by Joe Buck and Matt Vasgersian, respectively). The first game aired as part of the afternoon (U.S. time) Fox Saturday Baseball, and the second aired in the morning.

In November 2018, it was reported that Major League Baseball was nearing a deal with the BBC to broadcast the two games, with a broadcasting agreement similar to that of the NFL's partnership with the broadcaster. The league currently has a television rights deal with BT Sport, most recently renewed through 2021 to cover the London games. In May 2019, the BBC acquired digital rights to the London games for 2019 and 2020, with plans for a free-to-air television broadcast on the inaugural game. The two games were streamed live on BBC iPlayer and the BBC Sport website.

The Boston Red Sox Radio Network also carried the games, with announcers Joe Castiglione, Dave O’Brien, and Sean McDonough. WFAN (AM) carried the games in New York City.

Entertainment 

At the 2019 games, entertainment traditions from Red Sox and Yankees games were represented in-game, including the grounds crew performing "Y.M.C.A." (as is done at Yankee Stadium) and a "Sweet Caroline" sing-along (as is done at Fenway Park). "Theme from New York, New York" was played after both Yankee wins, as is done at Yankee Stadium. Fans voted for Winston Churchill, Freddie Mercury, King Henry VIII, and the Loch Ness Monster to be the entrants in the mascot races. "The Freeze", a spandex-clad sprinter who races fans at Atlanta Braves games, also appeared.

At the June 29 game, the national anthems of both the United States and the United Kingdom were performed by The Kingdom Choir; the ceremonial first pitches were thrown by participants of the Invictus Games with Prince Harry, Duke of Sussex, and his wife, Meghan, Duchess of Sussex, in attendance; the mascot race was won by Freddie Mercury; and The Freeze lost to a fan in their footrace.

At the June 30 game, the national anthems were performed by the Capital Children's Choir; The Freeze defeated  a fan in their footrace; and the mascot race was won by King Henry VIII.

Series summary

Game summaries
Both teams wore their home (white) jerseys in game one, in order for the Yankees to appear in their well-known pinstripes, despite being the visiting team. The Red Sox wore their home red alternate jerseys in game two,  with the Yankees again wearing their famous pinstripes. In late June, MLB announced that both teams would be allowed to have 26 active players on their rosters during the series (one more than MLB normally allows), with the extra man being a position player. Both teams were also allowed to have 28 players travel to London, in case a roster move (such as due to injury) was required.

Game 1
At 4 hours 42 minutes, the game was only three minutes shorter than the longest nine-inning game in MLB history (August 18, 2006, also between the Red Sox and Yankees). (The first inning alone, which saw both teams score six times, took 58 minutes.) The 30 total runs scored were the second-most ever in a game between these two teams (31 were scored on August 21, 2009, a 20–11 New York win). The attendance of 59,659 was the most at an MLB game since September 28, 2003, when a crowd of 60,988 at Qualcomm Stadium saw the San Diego Padres lose to the visiting Colorado Rockies.

Game 2

Boston had three first-inning home runs, the first time the team accomplished that feat since August 14, 1979. New York came from behind to take an 11–4 lead in the seventh inning, when they sent 14 batters to the plate. An eighth-inning homer by Didi Gregorius extended the Yankees' record of consecutive games with a home run to 31. The 50 total runs scored in the two-game series were the most ever in consecutive games between the Yankees and Red Sox.

See also
MLB China Series
MLB Japan Opening Series 2008
MLB Japan All-Star Series
MLB Taiwan All-Star Series
NFL International Series
MLB Puerto Rico Series
MLB Mexico Series

References

Further reading

External links 

 London Series at MLB.com

MLB London Series
2019 Major League Baseball season
2019 in British sport
MLB London Series
Boston Red Sox
International sports competitions in London
MLB London Series
New York Yankees